Carex gaudichaudiana, also known as fen sedge, is a tussock-forming species of perennial sedge in the family Cyperaceae. It is native to parts of Australia and New Zealand.

Description
The sedge has a long rhizome with loosely tufted shoots. It has erect inflorescences with a length of  composed of three to eight spikes.
In its native range it flowers in Spring and Summer between September and February.

Taxonomy
The species was first described by the botanist Carl Sigismund Kunth in 1837 as a part of the work Enumeratio Plantarum Omnium Hucusque Cognitarum, Secundum Familias Naturales Disposita, Adjectis Characteribus, Differentiis et Synonymis. Stutgardiae et Tubingae. It has six synonyms;
Carex gaudichaudiana var. typica Domin
Carex lacerans Kük.
Carex micrantha var. tenuinervis (Kük.) Kük.
Carex semiplena var. tenuinervis Kük.
Carex vulgaris var. gaudichaudiana (Kunth) Boott
Carex vulpi-caudata Akiyama.

Distribution
It is often found in damp areas including eastern and south eastern parts of Australia including South Australia, Victoria, New South Wales, Queensland and Tasmania as well as the North Island and South Island of New Zealand.

See also
List of Carex species

References

gaudichaudiana
Plants described in 1837
Taxa named by Carl Sigismund Kunth
Flora of the North Island
Flora of the South Island
Flora of South Australia
Flora of Victoria (Australia)
Flora of New South Wales
Flora of Queensland
Flora of Tasmania